Dobra Wola may refer to the following places:
Dobra Wola, Kuyavian-Pomeranian Voivodeship (north-central Poland)
Dobra Wola, Mława County in Masovian Voivodeship (east-central Poland)
Dobra Wola, Nowy Dwór Mazowiecki County in Masovian Voivodeship (east-central Poland)
Dobra Wola, Greater Poland Voivodeship (west-central Poland)
Dobra Wola, Warmian-Masurian Voivodeship (north Poland)